William Harris Smith (23 March 1906 – 1979) was a Scottish footballer.

He played for Burnbank Athletic, Norwich City, Exeter City and Stenhousemuir.

Notes

1906 births
1979 deaths
Scottish footballers
Association football fullbacks
Burnbank Athletic F.C. players
Scottish Junior Football Association players
Norwich City F.C. players
Exeter City F.C. players
Stenhousemuir F.C. players